Huliraaya (The Tiger Man) is a 2017 Indian Kannada-language thriller-drama film written and directed by Aravind Kaushik. It is produced by Nagesh Kogilu under the banner of SLN Creations. It features Balu Nagendra and Divya Uruduga in the lead roles. The film tells the story of the protagonist who is born around the wild forest region and his plight in coping up to the pace of the city life. The score and soundtrack for the film is by Arjun Ramu and the cinematography is by Ravee.

The film is distributed by Rakshit Shetty's Paramvah Studios in association with Pushkara Mallikarjunaiah's Pushkar Films. The film was released on 6 October 2017 to positive reviews from critics.

Cast
 Balu Nagendra as Suresaa / Huliraya
 Divya Uruduga as Lachi
 Chirashree Anchan as Malli
 Raghu Pandeshwar
 Renu
 Nagendra Kumar
 Kuldeep
 Sreenath Koundinya
 Pradeep
 Harish Neenasam
 Rakshith Shinde

Soundtrack

The film's score and soundtrack was composed by Arjun Ramu. The audio was released online on 26 April 2017 and the music rights were acquired by C Music. The soundtrack consists of five songs.

References

External links
 

2017 films
2010s Kannada-language films
Indian thriller drama films
2017 thriller drama films
2017 drama films
Films directed by Aravind Kaushik